Yellow Silk: Journal of Erotic Arts was a magazine founded by writer, editor,& designer Lily Pond and published quarterly from 1981 to 1996 on the belief that the erotic should play a more visible role in American arts and letters. The magazine promoted the idea of erotic energy being not only sexual desire but love of any kind. The publisher was Three Rivers Press and the magazine was based in Rhode Island.

Anthologies
Works published in this magazine were anthologized in:
Yellow Silk: Erotic Arts and Letters, Three Rivers Press, 1992, edited by Lily Pond and Richard Russo (AKA Richard A. Russo, not the novelist of the same name)
The Book of Eros: Arts and Letters from Yellow Silk, Three Rivers Press, 1996, 
Seven Hundred Kisses: A Yellow Silk Book of Erotic Writing, HarperOne, 1997, 
Yellow Silk II: International Erotic Stories and Poems , Grand Central Publishing 

Editor Lily Pond also published Pillow: Exploring the Heart of Eros (A Yellow Silk Book), Celestial Arts, 1998,

Contributors
Yellow Silk has showcased the work of a long list of notable writers and artists. Authors who have appeared in Yellow Silk include: Kim Addonizio, Angela Ball, Carolyn Banks, Robert Bly, Angela Carter, Marilyn Chin, Wanda Coleman, Franz Douskey, Margaret Drabble, Anita Endrezze, Louise Erdrich, Susan Griffin, Marilyn Hacker, Jane Hirshfield, Ha Jin, Galway Kinnell, William Kotzwinkle, Dorianne Laux, Mary Mackey, David Mamet, Carole Maso, W.S. Merwin, Bharati Mukherjee, Dennis Nurkse, Sharon Olds, Mary Oliver, Jennifer Jean O'Neill, Octavio Paz, Marge Piercy, Howard W. Robertson, Andrew Schelling, Ntozake Shange, Robert Silverberg, Nicole Stansbury, Terry Tempest Williams, and Robert Wrigley.

Artists and photographers who provided covers and interior illustrations, typically a single artist per issue, include:
Sigmund Abeles, Tee Corinne, Judy Dater, Betty LaDuke, Mayumi Oda, Stephen John Phillips, Jan Saudek, and Maurianna Nolan (Winkler).

References

External links 
Yellow Silk website with issue listing

Visual arts magazines published in the United States
Defunct magazines published in the United States
Quarterly magazines published in the United States
Magazines established in 1981
Magazines disestablished in 1996
1981 establishments in Rhode Island
1996 disestablishments in Rhode Island
Magazines published in Rhode Island